Dunnsville is an unincorporated community in Essex County, in the U.S. state of Virginia. U.S. Route 17, which transects the community, has a roadside historical marker commemorating the Rappahannock Industrial Academy. Natives of the community include Pauline C. Morton.

References

Unincorporated communities in Virginia
Unincorporated communities in Essex County, Virginia